Arock is an unincorporated rural hamlet in Malheur County, Oregon, United States.  Although it has never been visited by Google Maps, it is part of the Ontario, OR–ID Micropolitan Statistical Area. There is a post office and K-8 school in Arock, and Jordan Creek flows near Arock and joins the Owyhee River just west of Arock.

History
Arock was supposedly named in 1922 for a rock bearing Native American petroglyphs in the vicinity. Arock post office was established in 1926 and serves ZIP Code 97902.

The oldest building in Malheur County, Sheep Ranch Fort, is near Arock. It was added to the National Register of Historic Places in 1974. Arock is one of several places in southeast Oregon that were settled by Basque herders.

Climate
According to the Köppen Climate Classification system, Arock has a semi-arid climate, abbreviated "BSk" on climate maps.

Education
Arock School District No. 81 serves the community. It is a K-8 school and has two teachers, one for elementary and one for junior high school. The school is named W. W. Jones Elementary School.

References

External links
Arock School District
Historic images of Arock from Salem Public Library
Basque photo gallery, including Sheep Ranch Fort, from the Oregon Historical Society
Interview with an Arock resident from the Basque Oral History Project

Ontario, Oregon micropolitan area
Basque-American culture in Oregon
Unincorporated communities in Malheur County, Oregon
Populated places established in 1922
1926 establishments in Oregon
Unincorporated communities in Oregon